The 1966 USS Oriskany Fire was a major fire that broke out aboard the Essex-class aircraft carrier  on the morning of 26 October 1966. The fire broke out after a lit flare was locked in a flare locker. The fire killed 44 people, mostly air crew, and injured 156 more. It was the first of three major fires to befall American carriers during the Vietnam War.

Background 
Oriskany departed San Diego for her second Vietnam deployment, and third wartime deployment, on 26 May 1966. The carrier arrived on station off the coast of Vietnam a few weeks later, and commenced operations in support of operations in Vietnam.

Sequence of events 
At approximately 0728 hours, as Oriskany was preparing to begin flight operations and stowing ordnance from night operations, an alarm was sounded for a fire in compartment A-107-M, a flare locker, containing over 250 MK-24 magnesium flares, located just off the forward hangar deck, adjacent to the Starboard sponson. A flare had accidentally been actuated, and the sailor handling the flare had thrown it into the locker and dogged the door shut. Hundreds of these 24 lb. flares were stored here and were about to be ignited, burning at 3000 degrees. General quarters was sounded, and firefighting teams began to attempt to cool the area near the burning locker; because the high pressure within the locker made it impossible to open the locker door, fighting the fire directly was impossible. About 10 minutes into the fire, the pressure became so great that the doors blew out, igniting a helicopter located on the port side forward of the hangar deck. With the ship headed into the wind, getting ready to launch aircraft, the heat and smoke were drawn forward into the berthing quarters located forward of the hangar bay.  
Other sailors in the area worked to move aircraft, many of which were bomb and fuel laden, from the hangar to the flight deck to prevent them from catching fire. On deck six, in a pump room servicing the forward elevator, the sailor on duty attempted to close the large air vents servicing the compartment, which were starting to blow smoke in; unable to do so, he used wet rags to protect himself. Closer to the fire, sailors began attempting to evacuate "officers' country", a series of staterooms occupied largely by pilots assigned to Oriskany's air wing.

Within five minutes, an explosion occurred in the flare locker, the result of multiple flares igniting at once. Aircraft in the hangar bay caught fire, and nearby sailors attempting to cool the area were burned. Down in officers' country, several men were killed when a fireball shot down the passageway, burning their lungs. Other personnel suffocated to death in the passageways. On the flight deck, firefighting crews worked feverishly to cool the steel deck, while other flight deck personnel began pushing ordnance off the flight deck. Down in the hangar, the aircraft that caught fire were pushed over the side, along with ordnance that was staged in the hangar from an earlier replenishment.

A pilot trapped in his stateroom was able to find a wrench to open the porthole. With items in his room catching fire, the pilot continually wrapped himself in wet sheets or blankets, and kept his head out the porthole; as the sheets or blankets began to smolder, the pilot would wet the items down again, wrap himself up, and return to the porthole. Unable to escape due to the fire outside his room, the pilot kept this up for some time. Finally, an enlisted sailor discovered his plight and was able to supply him with a firehose, a battle lantern, and an Oxygen Breathing Apparatus; for the duration of the fire, the pilot used the hose to fight the fire and cool his stateroom, and keep the fire from spreading again into the room. Nearby, the executive officer of the air wing's Crusader squadron, finding himself in a similar situation, stripped naked and forced his way through his porthole. He was able to obtain a firefighting suit, and later helped the ship's fire marshal in organizing firefighting parties.

In the elevator pumproom, the fireman on duty attempted to request assistance from his supervisor. Frustrated over the lack of progress, the sailor tried to find out if there was something keeping help from reaching him, and discovered that a large amount of water from the firefighting efforts had settled over the hatch. He opened the hatch in an attempt to save himself, partially flooding the compartment in the process. Trapped by water and smoke, the fireman continued to try to keep himself safe until his supervisor and the ship's ordnance officer, a qualified Navy diver who happened to find scuba gear, entered the compartment and rescued him. Coincidentally, the scuba gear belonged to the trapped sailor.

Near the pump room, several officers and enlisted men took refuge in a void extending from below the hangar to a deck below the pumproom. One officer had been badly burned, and a second was knocked unconscious after nearly falling off a ladder inside the void. After breaking the padlocks off of storage spaces inside the void to release the usable air inside those spaces, the officers and men began to wait the fire out in the void. Eventually, though, they decided to try to make their way to safety. One of the enlisted men left the void to seek out an OBA, and was able to find a pair of stretcher bearers to help carry out the injured officers. Working through some initial difficulties, the officers and men eventually made their way to safety.

At approximately 1030 hours, the ship's fire marshal, who had been leading firefighting operations on the hangar deck, informed Damage Control Central that the fire was under control. The last of the smaller fires was extinguished around five hours later. Unable to remain on station, Oriskany set course for the Naval station at Subic Bay in the Philippines.

Aftermath 
Forty-three men died in the fire; one died shortly afterwards. On 28 October, a memorial service was held aboard Oriskany for those killed in the fire. After offloading her fallen and undergoing repair in Subic Bay, the ship returned to San Francisco's Hunters Point Naval Shipyard for more extensive repairs. The ship returned to service the following year, undergoing training before returning to Yankee Station. 
Several sailors, including the Chief Ordnance Officer were court-martialed, charged with 44 counts of manslaughter for their actions immediately prior to the fire; however, all were acquitted. A Navy investigation determined that magnesium flares, such as those involved in the fire, could ignite when jarred in certain cases; this is believed to be what caused the flare to initially ignite.

The fire aboard Oriskany would be the first of three major fires aboard American carriers in the latter half of the 1960s. A fire aboard USS Forrestal on July 29, 1967 killed 134 sailors and injured 161, and a fire aboard USS Enterprise on January 15, 1969, killed 28 sailors and injured 314.

Fatalities 
The officers and enlisted men who died aboard Oriskany are:

Ship's Company

(1)Died October 31, 1966

Carrier Air Wing 16 Staff

VAW-11

VAH-4

VA-25

VA-152

VA-163

VA-164

VF-111

VF-162

HC-1

Memorials 
A memorial was crafted around the ship's anchor after the ship was decommissioned in 1976, with plaques that represent the 44 deceased victims of the fire.

References 

Maritime incidents in 1966
+
Non-combat naval accidents
Ship fires
1966 fires in Asia
Explosions in 1966
United States Navy in the Vietnam War
Aircraft carrier fires